The 5th Season of National Cheerleading Championships reached another milestone by giving special slots to 2009 NCAA Cheerleading Competition, where top three winners will compete in this season's National Finals.

2010 NCAA Cheerleading Competition 

Legend:

Regional qualifiers

Central Luzon
Held at University of Assumption in San Fernando, Pampanga, on October 25, 2009

High school

Legend:

College 

Legend:

Mindanao 
Held at Xavier University - Ateneo de Cagayan in Cagayan de Oro, on November 15, 2009

High school

Legend:

College 

Legend:

North Luzon 
Held at University of the Cordilleras in Baguio City, on November 29, 2010

High school

Legend:

College 

Legend:

Notes

National Cheerleading Championship
Sports in the Philippines
2010 in Philippine sport